Richard Cromwell (1626–1712) was one of the sons of Oliver Cromwell, Protector of England.

Richard Cromwell may also refer to:

Sir Richard Williams (alias Cromwell) (1510–1544), also known as Sir Richard Cromwell, Welsh soldier and courtier, and nephew of Thomas Cromwell
Richard Cromwell (MP) (1572–1628), English MP for Huntingdon and Lostwithiel
Richard Cromwell (actor) (1910–1960), American actor